Cheesewood is a common name for several plants and may refer to:

Alstonia scholaris (White cheesewood)
Melodorum fruticosum (White cheesewood), native to southeast Asia
Pittosporum species
Nauclea orientalis (Leichhardt tree, yellow cheesewood, Canary cheesewood)